"Walk on Air" is a song by British band T'Pau, which was released in 1991 as the second single from their third studio album The Promise. It was written by Carol Decker and Ron Rogers, and produced by Andy Richards. "Walk on Air" reached No. 62 on the UK Singles Chart and remained in the charts for two weeks.

A music video was filmed to promote the single. The 7" single's B-side, a live version of "Hold on to Love", was exclusive to the single and described as a previously unreleased alternate "unplugged"-style recording of the track from The Promise. The 12" and CD formats featured the additional track "Dirty Town", a non-LP song that would re-appear as B-side to the band's next single "Soul Destruction".

Background
Decker was inspired to write the lyrics of "Walk on Air" after a friend's boyfriend was killed in a motorcycle accident. She revealed of the song's message in 2019, "You never know what is going to happen to you. You just never know. Life can turn on a sixpence."

Critical reception
On its release, Terry Staunton of New Musical Express commented, "'Walk on Air' sounds not unlike John Waite's 'Missing You', which is fine by me." He added that T'Pau are "no-nonsense pomp rockers who know what they want to do and do it very well". Andrew Hirst of the Huddersfield Daily Examiner picked the song as the newspaper's "single of the week" and praised it as a "fine bout of chartbound chugging melodic rock".

Track listing
7-inch single
"Walk on Air" – 4:34
"Hold on to Love" – 4:33

12-inch and CD single
"Walk on Air" – 4:34
"Hold on to Love" – 4:33
"Dirty Town" – 4:03

Personnel
T'Pau
 Carol Decker – lead vocals
 Dean Howard – lead guitar
 Ronnie Rogers – rhythm guitar
 Michael Chetwood – keyboards
 Paul Jackson – bass guitar
 Tim Burgess – drums

Production
 Andy Richards – producer of "Walk on Air"
 Chris Lord-Alge – mixing on "Walk on Air"
 Bob Ludwig – mastering on "Walk on Air"
 T'Pau – producers of "Hold on to Love" and "Dirty Town"

Other
 Tony McGee – photography
 Mark Millington/The Graphic Edge – sleeve design

Charts

References

External links

1991 songs
1991 singles
T'Pau (band) songs
Virgin Records singles
Songs written by Carol Decker
Songs written by Ron Rogers